Boyet is both a given name and surname. Notable people with the name include:

 Benjamin Boyet (born 1979), French rugby union footballer
 Boyet Bautista (born 1981), Filipino basketball player
 Boyet Fernandez (21st century), Filipino champion basketball head coach
 Boyet Sison (1963–2022), Filipino journalist and sports commentator

Filipino masculine given names
French-language surnames